Androya is a genus of flowering plants in the family Scrophulariaceae. It is endemic to the southwest of Madagascar.

Taxonomy 
It was first described by H.Perrier in 1952.

Species 
This taxon only contains one species, Androya decaryi.

Description 
This evergreen shrub can be found at elevations between 0 - 499m.

Uses

Traditional medicine 
A decoction of this plant is used to treat symptoms associated with malaria and yellow fever.

Chemistry 
Three spermidine alkaloids are known to be present in Androya decaryi. They are (–)-(2S)-2-phenyl-1,5,9-triazacyclotridecan-4-one, (+)-decaryine A and (–)-decaryine B. However, there is no sufficient evidence to suggest that these three chemicals have any significant activity against Plasmodium falciparum.

References 

Scrophulariaceae
Plants described in 1952
Endemic flora of Madagascar
Scrophulariaceae genera
Monotypic Lamiales genera
Taxa named by Joseph Marie Henry Alfred Perrier de la Bâthie